The American Eagles men's basketball team represents American University in Washington, D.C. in NCAA Division I competition. The school's team competes in the Patriot League and play their home games in Bender Arena.  Their rivals include Boston University, Bucknell University, and Navy.

Postseason history

NCAA Division I Tournament results
The Eagles have appeared in the NCAA Division I tournament three times. Their combined record is 0–3.

2007–08 season
In 2008, the Eagles earned their first ever bid to the NCAA Division I tournament by defeating Colgate in the final round of the Patriot League tournament. The Eagles were seeded 15th against #2 Tennessee. American held tight against the Volunteers most of the game, but Tennessee pulled away to win 72–57.

2008–09 season
In 2009, the Eagles would again earn entry to the NCAA Division I tournament by defeating Holy Cross 73–57 to win the Patriot League tournament for a second consecutive year. They were seeded 14th and faced off against #3 Villanova. The Eagles held a lead for most of the game and led by 10 points at halftime, but eventually lost 80–67 after a significant Wildcats comeback.

2013–14 season
American earned the Patriot League's automatic berth to the NCAA men's basketball tournament with a 55–36 win over Boston University on Wed., March 12 at Agganis Arena in Boston, Mass in the Patriot League tournament final.

In their first season under coach Mike Brennan, the second-seeded Eagles led from start to finish in the decisive victory while holding the top-seeded Terriers to the lowest point total in Patriot League Championship game history. American point guard Darius Gardner scored 18 points on 7-of-9 shooting and was named Tournament MVP.

The Eagles advanced to the NCAA tournament for the first time since winning their second of back-to-back titles in 2009. They played Wisconsin and lost 75–35

NCAA Division II Tournament results
The Eagles have appeared in the NCAA Division II tournament three times. Their combined record is 6–3.

NAIA Tournament results
The Eagles have appeared in the NAIA tournament two times. Their combined record is 0–2.

NIT results
The Eagles have appeared in the National Invitation Tournament (NIT) three times. Their combined record is 0–3.

CIT results
The Eagles have appeared in the CollegeInsider.com Postseason Tournament (CIT) one time. Their record is 0–1.

See also
American Eagles women's basketball

External links